The Sápmi football team is a football team representing the Sámi people, who inhabit northern parts of Norway, Sweden, Finland and Russia. The team is not a member of UEFA or FIFA, and therefore does not participate in their competitions, though is member of the Confederation of Independent Football Associations. It is organized by FA Sápmi.

Tournament history
Sápmi participated in the KTFF 50th Anniversary Cup in 2005 in Northern Cyprus, losing matches against Northern Cyprus and Kosovo and finishing third. In November 2006, Sápmi took part in – and won – the inaugural VIVA World Cup in Occitania, organised by the NF-Board. Sápmi overcame both the host nation and Monaco to win the trophy, scoring an impressive 42 goals in 3 games. They hosted the next finals in 2008, defeating Kurdistan to finish third, before travelling to Padania in 2009 where they again finished third. Sápmi have not participated in a VIVA World Cup since.

FA Sápmi hosted the 2014 ConIFA World Football Cup and it competed at the 2016 ConIFA World Football Cup.

Notable players
Sápmi footballers who have played for both the Norwegian national side and the Sápmi team include Morten Gamst Pedersen, Sigurd Rushfeldt and Tom Høgli. Steffen Nystrøm, of Tromsø IL has played for the Norway under-21 team, and made his Sápmi debut in the VIVA World Cup.

Tournament records

World Cup record

Selected internationals

Current squad
Sápmi squad at the 2016 ConIFA World Football Cup in Abkhazia, 28 May – 6 June 2016.

References

 
CONIFA member associations
European N.F.-Board teams
Football in Finland
Football teams in Norway
Football in Sweden
Sámi
Sámi associations
1985 establishments in Finland
1985 establishments in Norway
1985 establishments in Sweden